Julia Vargas Avenue is a central east–west arterial road that passes through Ortigas Center in Metro Manila, Philippines. It is a four-lane divided road with one-way protected bike lanes that runs parallel to Ortigas Avenue to the north and Shaw Boulevard to the south. The avenue stretches  from Eulogio Rodriguez Jr. Avenue (C-5 Road) in Ugong, Pasig in the east to Epifanio de los Santos Avenue (EDSA) in Wack-Wack Greenhills, Mandaluyong in the west. 

It was named for philanthropist Doña Julia Vargas y Camus vda. de Ortigas, wife of Ortigas & Company Limited Partnership founder Don Francisco Ortigas y Barcinas who owned the Hacienda de Mandaloyon estate on which Ortigas Center was built.

Route description

Julia Vargas Avenue originates at an intersection with C-5 Road, also known as E. Rodriguez, Jr. Avenue, where SM Center Pasig is located. It heads west across Valle Verde. Between the next intersection at Lanuza Avenue and City Golf, Vargas serves as the boundary between Valle Verde 3 and 4 villages. It passes the Ortigas Home Depot, a Sitel call center building, and a row of bars on the northern side before it comes to an intersection with Meralco Avenue and the Meralco flyover. 

West of Meralco Avenue, the avenue officially enters the Ortigas Center business district. It passes the office towers in San Antonio, Pasig toward the border with Barangay Wack-Wack Greenhills, Mandaluyong at the intersection with ADB Avenue and San Miguel Avenue where the El Pueblo Real de Manila strip mall is located. This span of Julia Vargas Avenue onwards used to contain one-way unprotected bike lanes, which has since become faded.

The Ortigas Walkways Project, a series of elevated pedestrian walkways, covers the span of Julia Vargas Avenue within San Antonio.

From ADB and San Miguel to its western terminus at EDSA, Vargas is one-way westbound only, with the left side of the road only allowing left turns to St. Francis Street, while the right side of the road continues as a service road and allows right turns to Bank Drive. Here, at the western edge of Ortigas Center, is St. Francis Square Mall, San Miguel Corporation Headquarters, and SM Megamall, where the avenue ends at EDSA.

Development

Carpool lanes 
The road was previously a six-lane divided avenue with no bike lanes until 2018, when an experimental road diet was implemented, changing the corridor into a widened four-lane (two lanes per direction) divided avenue with one-way bike lanes with bollards. On each direction, one lane acted as a carpool lane for at least four passengers per vehicle, while the other was designated as a non-carpool lane.

This traffic scheme has since been rescinded due to it being confusing for motorists. Despite this, the lane markings remain, with vehicle traffic during rush hours largely ignoring the lane markings, informally reverting the avenue back into its six-lane (three lanes per direction) state.

Motorcycle and bike lanes 
In March 2021, Pasig Mayor Vico Sotto announced that the avenue would undergo another road diet, shrinking the two car lanes and adding a motorcycle lane parallel to the bike lane. The bike lane will also be physically separated by plant boxes.

Intersections

Landmarks
 Antel Global Corporate Center
 Integrated Bar of the Philippines
 Metrobank Ortigas Center
 The Centerpoint Ortigas
 The Currency Ortigas
 City Golf
 El Pueblo
 One Corporate Center
 CW Home Depot
 New Metropolitan Manila Development Authority Head Office
 San Miguel Corporation Headquarters
 St. Francis Square Mall
 Sitel 
 SM Center Pasig
 SM Megamall
 The Podium
 Valle Verde
 Ortigas East

Notes

References

Streets in Metro Manila